Bavanište (Serbian Cyrillic: Баваниште) is a village in Serbia. It is situated in the Kovin municipality, in the South Banat District of Vojvodina province. The village has a Serb ethnic majority (89.37%) and its population numbers 6,106 people (2002 census).

Name
In Serbian the village is known as Bavanište (Баваниште), in Romanian as Bavaniște, in Hungarian as Homokbálványos, and in German as Bawanischte.

Historical population

1948: 5,805
1953: 6,066
1961: 6,133
1971: 6,322
1981: 6,412
1991: 6,517

Major ethnic groups

See also
List of places in Serbia
List of cities, towns and villages in Vojvodina

References
Slobodan Ćurčić, Broj stanovnika Vojvodine, Novi Sad, 1996.

External links

 Bavanište prezentacija

Populated places in Serbian Banat
Populated places in South Banat District
Kovin